Adam MacKenzie (born 25 October 1984 in Kirkcaldy) is a male field hockey defender from Scotland, who earned his first cap for the Men's Junior National Team in 2003. He plays club hockey for Inverleith HC.

He is the brother-in-law of Na Piarsaigh Junior B City Football champion Brian Buckley.

References
sportscotland

1984 births
Living people
Scottish male field hockey players
Field hockey players at the 2006 Commonwealth Games
Sportspeople from Kirkcaldy
Commonwealth Games competitors for Scotland